The 1932 International cricket season was from April 1932 to August 1932.

Season overview

June

Ireland in Scotland

Indian in England

July

South Americans in Scotland

Test Trial in England

August

England in Netherlands

References

1932 in cricket